Aescin or escin is a mixture of saponins with anti-inflammatory, vasoconstrictor and vasoprotective effects found in Aesculus hippocastanum (the horse chestnut). Aescin is the main active component in horse chestnut, and is responsible for most of its medicinal properties. The main active compound of aescin is β-aescin, although the mixture also contains various other components including α-aescin, protoescigenin, barringtogenol, cryptoescin and benzopyrones.

Evidence suggests that aescin, especially pure β-aescin, is a safe and effective treatment for short-term treatment of chronic venous insufficiency; however, more high quality randomized controlled trials are required to confirm the effectiveness.  Horse chestnut extract may be as effective and well tolerated as the use of compression stockings.

Mechanism of action
Aescin appears to produce effects through a wide range of mechanisms. It induces endothelial nitric oxide synthesis by making endothelial cells more permeable to calcium ions, and also induces release of prostaglandin F2α. Other possible mechanisms include serotonin antagonism and histamine antagonism and reduced catabolism of tissue mucopolysaccharides.

References

External links 
Information on horse chestnut extract from Memorial Sloan-Kettering Cancer Center
 - alpha-Aescin

Saponins
Triterpene glycosides
Acetate esters